Gilbert Community School District is a rural public school district headquartered in Gilbert, Iowa.

The district is mostly in Story County but has a portion in Boone County. The district serves Gilbert and sections of northern Ames. 

The district covers 48 square miles.

List of Schools
The Gilbert Community Schools consists of Gilbert Elementary, Gilbert Intermediate School, the Gilbert Middle School, and Gilbert High School. The grade structure is a K–2, 3–5, 6–8, and 9–12 system.

Enrollment
As of 2006, the enrollment had increased by more than 55% since 1990, with the number of students climbing to over 1,061 as of July 2006. Many students live in the northern part of Ames. Enrollment in the district increased by eight percent during the 2005–2006 school year. The school board, anticipating that it will build another elementary school within a few years if the district continues to grow at its current pace, has obtained an option to buy  just west of Gilbert's residential area and on the north side of the main highway through town. 
From 2006 to 2020, the enrollment grew an additional 41%.

See also
List of school districts in Iowa
List of high schools in Iowa

References

Further reading

External links
 Gilbert Community School District
 

School districts in Iowa
Education in Boone County, Iowa
Education in Story County, Iowa
Ames, Iowa